The 2013 Australia Open Grand Prix Gold was the third Grand Prix Gold and Grand Prix tournament of the 2013 BWF Grand Prix Gold and Grand Prix. The tournament was held in Sydney Convention and Exhibition Centre, Sydney, Australia April 2 until April 7, 2013 and had a total purse of $120,000.

Men's singles

Seeds

  Lee Chong Wei (semi-final)
  Nguyen Tien Minh (quarter-final)
  Daren Liew (third round)
  Chong Wei Feng (quarter-final)
  Simon Santoso (third round)
  Taufik Hidayat (third round)
  Gao Huan (third round)
  Hsu Jen-hao (second round)
  Ajay Jayaram (second round)
  Mohd Arif Abdul Latif (second round)
  Rajah Menuri Venkata Gurusaidutt (third round)
  Alamsyah Yunus (semi-final)
  Niluka Karunaratne (first round)
  Anand Pawar (second round)
  Kazumasa Sakai (second round)
  Kento Momota (third round)

Finals

Top half

Section 1

Section 2

Section 3

Section 4

Bottom half

Section 5

Section 6

Section 7

Section 8

Women's singles

Seeds

  Lindaweni Fanetri (quarter-final)
  Sapsiree Taerattanachai (quarter-final)
  Pai Hsiao-ma (semi-final)
  Nichaon Jindapon (final)
  Aprilia Yuswandari (first round)
  Nozomi Okuhara (withdrew)
  Sayaka Takahashi (champion)
  Sonia Cheah Su Ya (second round)

Finals

Top half

Section 1

Section 2

Bottom half

Section 3

Section 4

Men's doubles

Seeds

  Koo Kien Keat / Tan Boon Heong (quarter-final)
  Angga Pratama / Ryan Agung Saputra (champion)
  Goh V Shem / Lim Khim Wah (second round)
  Mohd Zakry Abdul Latif / Mohd Fairuzizuan Mohd Tazari (semi-final)
  Mohammad Ahsan / Hendra Setiawan (final)
  Gan Teik Chai / Ong Soon Hock (quarter-final)
  Chen Hung-ling / Lu Chia-bin (first round)
  Ricky Karanda Suwardi / Muhammad Ulinnuha (quarter-final)

Finals

Top half

Section 1

Section 2

Bottom half

Section 3

Section 4

Women's doubles

Seeds

  Pia Zebadiah Bernadeth / Rizki Amelia Pradipta (first round)
  Savitree Amitrapai / Sapsiree Taerattanachai (final)
  Vivian Hoo Kah Mun / Woon Khe Wei (quarter-final)
  Ng Hui Ern / Ng Hui Lin  (quarter-final)
  Jang Ye-na / Kim So-young (first round)
  Reika Kakiiwa / Yuki Fukushima (quarter-final)
  Komala Dewi / Jenna Gozali (quarter-final)
  Vita Marissa / Variella Aprilsasi (champion)

Finals

Top half

Section 1

Section 2

Bottom half

Section 3

Section 4

Mixed doubles

Seeds

  Markis Kido / Pia Zebadiah Bernadeth (quarter-final)
  Riky Widianto / Richi Puspita Dili (quarter-final)
  Irfan Fadhilah / Weni Anggraini (champion)
  Tan Aik Quan / Lai Pei Jing (quarter-final)
  Patiphat Chalardchaleam / Savitree Amitrapai (first round)
  Praveen Jordan / Vita Marissa (first round)
  Shin Baek-cheol / Jang Ye-na (final)
  Kim Dae-eun / Kim So-young (quarter-final)

Finals

Top half

Section 1

Section 2

Bottom half

Section 3

Section 4

References

Australian Open (badminton)
Australia
Badminton Australian Open
Australian Open